Ahakista ( or Áth an Chiste) is located approximately halfway along the Sheep's Head peninsula between Durrus and Kilcrohane in County Cork, Ireland.  It is a wooded coastal village with a deep and sheltered harbour.

History

Archaeology
There is a stone circle in the area at Gorteanish that dates to the Bronze Age (2200 – 600 B.C.).

Air India disaster

The Air India Memorial Garden is located at Ahakista, and each June the local community remembers the terrorist attack of 1985 that resulted in the deaths of over 300 people. On Sunday 23 June 1985 just after 08:00 in the morning, an Air India Boeing 747, flying from Canada to India with 329 people on board, was approaching the southwest coast of Ireland when it was blown apart by a bomb, killing everyone on board.

In the days that followed, an extensive search was undertaken. Only about half the bodies were ever recovered, and they were brought to Cork Regional Hospital. Shortly afterwards, many relatives of the dead flew from India and Canada and travelled by bus to be near to the place where their loved ones died. They stopped at Ahakista and threw wreaths into the sea. They expressed a wish that a memorial be erected to commemorate the disaster, and Cork County Council subsequently purchased the site and built a memorial. It was officially opened on 23 June 1986 at a ceremony attended by the Foreign Ministers of Ireland, India and Canada.

A commemoration is held each year on 23 June at 08:00. A sundial, designed by Cork sculptor, Ken Thompson, is the focal point of the garden and the sun hits the dial at the time of the explosion.

Amenities

Ahakista has a church and two pubs – both with beer gardens and sea views. One pub is known as the 'tin pub'. Other amenities include a wine shop, two Bed and Breakfasts, several self-catering accommodations (two of which are known as "Ahakista Escape") and a garden centre. There is a small sandy beach, and the  Sheep's Head Way marked trail crosses through the village. In August 2008 this Walkway became one of the first four publicly funded walkways in Ireland – following agreement between the Department of Rural Affairs and the Irish Farmers Association.

Schools
Ahakista has a primary school and there is daily transportation to secondary schools in Bantry. The local primary school is called Rusnachara National School, and had 26 pupils as of 2013.

Transport
There is a bus service to Bantry three days per week, and the nearest major airport is Cork Airport.

Regatta
The sheltered deep water harbour is home to both fishing boats and pleasure craft and the annual Ahakista Regatta is held each August bank holiday weekend.

People
Wolf Mankowitz (writer, playwright and screenwriter) lived for many years in Ahakista, till his death in 1998
Noel Streatfeild (author) spent many summers in Ahakista. The screen version of her children's book "The Growing Summer" (also published as "The Magic Summer") was filmed on the peninsula (Ahakista, Kilcrohane) and in Bantry. Several scenes were shot in the actual places she had envisaged when writing the book. London Weekend Television produced the six-episode serial in 1969, starring Wendy Hiller as Aunt Dymphna. The film won a silver medal at the 1969 Venice Film Festival.
Kei Pilz, Japanese chef.
Graham Norton (comedian and talk show host) owns a holiday home with a private beach in Ahakista which overlooks the harbour and Dunmanus Bay.

See also

 List of towns and villages in Ireland

Notes and references

Towns and villages in County Cork